Lissagria is a genus of rove beetles in the family Staphylinidae. There are about eight described species in Lissagria.

Species
These eight species belong to the genus Lissagria:
 Lissagria fissilis Casey
 Lissagria foveolata Eldredge
 Lissagria impressifrons Casey
 Lissagria laeviuscula (LeConte, 1866)
 Lissagria laticeps (Notman, 1920)
 Lissagria longicollis Casey
 Lissagria minuscula Casey
 Lissagria robusta Casey

References

Further reading

 
 
 
 

Aleocharinae
Articles created by Qbugbot